The 1983 Bristol City Council election took place on 5 May 1983 to elect members of Bristol City Council in England. This was on the same day as other local elections. All seats were up for election, two seats in every ward, due to the introduction of new ward boundaries. Therefore, direct comparisons with previous elections are not possible. Majority is the number of votes separating the 2nd and 3rd candidates. Alliance candidates who were Liberals are described as such. No party had an overall majority; as the largest party the Conservatives formed a minority administration.

Ward results

Ashley

Avonmouth

Bedminster

Bishopston

Bishopsworth

Brislington East

Brislington West

Cabot

Clifton

Cotham

Easton

Eastville

Filwood

Frome Vale

Hartcliffe

Henbury

Hengrove

Henleaze

Hillfields

Horfield

Kingsweston

Knowle

Lawrence Hill

Lockleaze

Redland

St George East

St George West

Southmead

Southville

Stockwood

Stoke Bishop

Westbury-on-Trym

Whitchurch Park

Windmill Hill

Sources
 Bristol Evening Post 6 May 1983

1983
1983 English local elections
1980s in Bristol